The Fella with the Fiddle is a 1937 Warner Bros. Merrie Melodies cartoon directed by Friz Freleng. The short was released on March 27, 1937.

The title is derived from the cartoon's theme song, written by Charlie Abbott.

Plot
When the kids fight over a coin for ice cream, J. Field Mouse tells his grandchildren the story of a mouse whose greed and dishonesty became his undoing. Feigning blindness and playing the fiddle, he collects enough money to live an opulent lifestyle. His home, marked by a shabby exterior, turns out to be a mansion where he lives it up with his riches. All the fiddler's luxury is in jeopardy when the tax assessor knocks on the door. The fiddler hurriedly presses a series of buttons to hide his opulence and make his home look like a hovel. He succeeds in confusing the tax assessor to the point that he flees in frustration, but an eavesdropping cat plays on the fiddler's greed and lures him into his jaws by placing a gold coin there. And that, says J. Field Mouse to his grandchildren, was the end of the greedy mouse. One of the grandchildren asked if the greedy mouse got eaten. The grandfather said, "Yes, he ate him all up,". But one of his grandchildren notices a gold (cat's?) tooth hanging on display and realizes that things weren't quite what they seem.

Home media
LaserDisc – The Golden Age of Looney Tunes, Volume 5, Side 3

Notes/Goofs
This cartoon was re-released into the Blue Ribbon Merrie Melodies program on January 20, 1945. Because the cartoon credits Schlesinger on re-release, the original closing title card was kept. This Blue Ribbon reissue was the final to credit Leon Schlesinger. This meant that cartoons originally released between 1936 and 1944 that were re-released after 1945 also had their original ending titles scrapped out.
This short is the first Merrie Melodies short with Mel Blanc voicing characters.
The original ending titles have been found on an 8mm VHS.
This was one of at least two cartoons depicting an opulent home capable of being quickly disguised as a hovel for purposes of tax evasion. The other was the 1949 Tex Avery cartoon "The House of Tomorrow."

References

External links
Big Cartoon Database entry at http://www.bcdb.com/cartoon/143-Fella_With_A_Fiddle.html
Internet Movie Database entry at https://www.imdb.com/title/tt0028859/

1937 films
1937 comedy films
1937 animated films
Short films directed by Friz Freleng
Merrie Melodies short films
Films scored by Carl Stalling
1930s Warner Bros. animated short films
1930s English-language films